The 2008 Swindon Borough Council election took place on 4 May 2008 to elect members of Swindon Unitary Council in Wiltshire, England. One third of the council was up for election and the Conservative Party stayed in overall control of the council.

After the election, the composition of the council was
Conservative 43
Labour 12
Liberal Democrat 3
Independent 1

Campaign
Several unusual events attracted attention during the campaign. A yorkshire terrier was reported as having received a polling card for the election, with his owner being faced with being charged with supplying false electoral information and as a result had to write a letter of apology. Meanwhile, Swindon council got a look-alike of Captain Jack Sparrow to hand out balloons and leaflets on the election in an attempt to increase interest in the election.

Election result
The results saw each party end with the same number of seats as before the election with the Conservatives remaining in control with 43 seats. The Conservatives gained one seat from Labour in Park ward but Labour also took a seat back from the Conservatives in Central ward. In total 15 councillors were re-elected with Labour staying on 12 seats, the Liberal Democrats 3 and 1 independent.

Ward results

References

2008 English local elections
2008
2000s in Wiltshire